Sonny Stitt / Live at Ronnie Scott's is the fifth Dick Morrissey Quartet recording. It comprises a jam session with Sonny Stitt 
recorded live at Ronnie Scott's Jazz Club, London in 1965. It has also been released on the same label with the title Sonny's Blues.

Track listing 

"Ernest's Blues"
"Home Sweet Home"
"M-O-T-H-E-R"
"My Mother's Eyes"
"Sonny's Theme Song"
"Blues with Dick and Harry"
"It Could Happen to You" (Johnny Burke and Jimmy Van Heusen)
"Oh, Lady Be Good!" (George and Ira Gershwin)
Interview with Sonny Stitt

Personnel 

Ernest Ranglin - Guitar
Sonny Stitt - tenor sax
Dick Morrissey - tenor sax
Harry South - piano 
Phil Bates - double bass
Bill Eyden - drums

Dick Morrissey albums
Sonny Stitt live albums
1965 live albums
Self-released albums
Albums recorded at Ronnie Scott's Jazz Club